Rauvolfia sachetiae is a species of plant in the family Apocynaceae. It is endemic to the Marquesas Islands in French Polynesia. It is listed as a "Critically endangered" species.

References

sachetiae
Flora of French Polynesia
Critically endangered plants
Plants described in 1981
Taxonomy articles created by Polbot